{{Infobox drug
| drug_name         =
| INN               =
| type              = 
| IUPAC_name        = 2-Ethylsulfanyl-1'H-benzimidazole
| image             = Bemethyl.svg
| alt               = 
| caption           =

| pronounce         =
| tradename        = Metaprot, Antihot, Bemitil, Bemithylum, Bemactor
| Drugs.com         = 
| MedlinePlus       = 
| pregnancy_AU      = 
| pregnancy_AU_comment = 
| pregnancy_US      = 
| pregnancy_category= 
| routes_of_administration = Oral as (tablets or capsules)
| legal_AU = 
| legal_AU_comment =
| legal_BR =  
| legal_BR_comment =
| legal_CA = 
| legal_DE = 
| legal_NZ = 
| legal_UK = 
| legal_US = unscheduled
| legal_US_comment = Not FDA approved
| legal_UN = 
| legal_status = Rx-only (RU)

| bioavailability   = 
| protein_bound     = 
| metabolism        = 
| metabolites       =
| onset             = 
| elimination_half-life = 
| duration_of_action =
| excretion         = 

| index2_label = hydrobromide
| CAS_number        = 14610-11-8
| CAS_number_Ref = 
| CAS_number2        = 109628-14-0
| CAS_number2_Ref = 
| UNII_Ref = 
| UNII = 2S44TEQ96E
| UNII2_Ref = 
| UNII2 = TG4SAK8A5M
| class             = 
| ATCvet            = 
| ATC_prefix        = 
| ATC_suffix        = 
| PubChem           = 720878
| DrugBank          = 
| synonyms          = bemetil, bemithil, bemithyl, bemythyl, Metaproth, Metaprote, 2-benzilidazol-thioethyl, 2-ethylthiobenzimidazole hydrobromide, 2-ethylsulfanyl-1H-benzimidazole;hydrobromide

| C=9|H=10|N=2|S=1
| smiles = CCSC1=NC2=CC=CC=C2N1
| ChemSpiderID=629280
| StdInChI_Ref = 
| StdInChI = 1S/C9H10N2S/c1-2-12-9-10-7-5-3-4-6-8(7)11-9/h3-6H,2H2,1H3,(H,10,11)
| StdInChIKey_Ref = 
| StdInChIKey = UGCOPUIBNABIEP-UHFFFAOYSA-N
}}

Bemethyl, also commonly referred to in literature as bemitil, is a synthetic actoprotector which is also antihypoxant (combating conditions of hypoxia),  antioxidant, and antimutagenic.  Certified in Ukraine as a dietary supplement, bemethyl is commonly used in preparing for international competitions by Ukrainian national sport teams. Bemethyl is formulated as a hydrobromide salt. Its parent compound is 2-ethylsulfanyl-1H''-benzimidazole.

Medical uses

Effects and benefits
Bemethyl is primarily classified as an actoprotector; a synthetic adaptogen with significant capacity to increase physical performance.

Bemethyl also has a positive effect on metabolic processes, allowing adaptation to conditions causing frequent hypoxia, and the obtained effect is long-lasting and also occurs after the end of dosage.

Bemethyl has been shown to preserve both physical and mental capacity in high-altitude, low-oxygen environments, particularly by its effect in helping control excess serum levels of cholesterol and bilirubin, which are known to have negative effects especially during adjustment to high-altitude environments.

Bemethyl has also been shown to prevent permanent hearing loss and facilitate recovery of hearing after mine-explosion trauma, when treatment is initiated immediately after injury.

Clinical research

Anti-mutagenic
In one study, bemethyl was shown to prevent the mutagenic effect of white asbestos in mice and in cultured human whole blood.

A study using mice showed bemethyl to reduce mutation induced by certain mutagenic drugs.

Another study using cells from human donors showed Bemethyl to be anticlastogenic (able to minimize chromosome breakages).

Pharmacology

Pharmacokinetics
Bemethyl resists metabolization and is long-lived, accumulating in tissues over course of treatment.
In one study involving rats, long-term administration of Bemethyl was accompanied by a 1.38-fold increase in drug concentration in the brain, and a 1.68-fold increase in its concentration in skeletal muscles.

History

Bemethyl was developed in the 1970s by the Department of Pharmacology of the St. Petersburg State Military Medical Academy under the direction of Professor Vladimir Vinogradov. Professor Vinogradov and his research team earned the USSR State Prize for this accomplishment.

First used with Soviet cosmonauts, Bemethyl was also used to prepare athletes of the USSR national team for the Moscow 1980 Olympic Games. In the 1990s, bemethyl saw use as a basic medicinal agent in many of the corps of the Soviet and Russian armies, including Soviet troops in Afghanistan, as bemethyl facilitated increased endurance for soldiers over long marches, as well as an enhanced work capacity and stability to hypoxia and high temperatures. Bemethyl was also used to enhance the physical and mental capacities of workers deployed in the wake of the 1986 Chernobyl disaster.

Legal

In 2018, bemethyl was added to the Monitoring Program of the World Anti-Doping Agency.

As of 2021 it remains in the Monitoring Program,

and therefore is not on the Prohibited List; presently only being monitored to potentially detect patterns of misuse in sport.
The WADA Monitoring Program is also recognized by the U.S. Anti-Doping Agency,
 as bemethyl continues not to be a "banned substance" in sports.

References 

Benzimidazoles
Thioethers